Ponte Almirante Sarmento Rodrigues (also known as the Ponte Rodoviária de Barca d'Alva) is a road bridge over the Douro, located near the village of Barca d'Alva in Guarda District, Portugal, around  west of the border with Spain. It carries national route N221.

The bridge was designed in 1955 by Edgar Cardoso. It is named for Portuguese naval officer and colonial administrator Sarmento Rodrigues.

See also
List of bridges in Portugal

References

External links
 

Almirante Sarmento Rodrigues
Buildings and structures in Figueira de Castelo Rodrigo
Buildings and structures in Guarda District